"I Still Believe" is the ninth single by UK-based songwriter Frank Turner, and the first of his fourth EP Rock & Roll. It was released on 28 October 2010. "I Still Believe" had a limited release of 500 7" vinyl's for the 2012 Record Store Day on 21 April. The B-Side to the vinyl is Frank's cover of Queen's "Somebody to Love". Both of which were released digitally a week later on 30 April.

The song was also featured on his fourth studio album England Keep My Bones.  It also appeared on Isles of Wonder, the soundtrack album of the 2012 Summer Olympics opening ceremony.

Upon its re-release in 2012, it reached No. 40 on the UK Singles Chart, becoming Turner's first top 40 hit.

The most recent performance of the song took place in October 2022 at SWG3 Glasgow.  The Hearld described the performance as immensely popular, attracting "the biggest singalong" of the show.

Track listing

Charts

References

2010 singles
Frank Turner songs
Xtra Mile Recordings singles
2010 songs
Songs written by Frank Turner